Louis Ivory (born February 6, 1980) is a former American college football running back. He played for Furman.

Early life
Ivory was born in Fort Valley, Georgia, where he attended Peach County High School.

College career
Ivory grew up 140 miles from Division I-AA (now known as Division I FCS) powerhouse Georgia Southern, which did not recruit him. He instead attended rival Furman University. In 2000, Ivory recorded 2,079 rushing yards and 16 touchdowns on 286 carries.

As a junior, he received the 2000 Walter Payton Award for the most outstanding player in Division I-AA. In his senior year, Ivory rushed for 1,719 yards and 19 touchdowns on 289 carries.

See also

References

External links 
 
 Sports Network
 Official Athletics Site Furman Paladins

People from Fort Valley, Georgia
American football running backs
Furman Paladins football players
Players of American football from Georgia (U.S. state)
Living people
1980 births
Walter Payton Award winners